This is a list of all the banks incorporated in Romania .

Banks incorporated in Romania

Retail banks (foreign-owned banks)
Alpha Bank
Banca Comercială Română (part of the Erste Group)
BRD – Groupe Société Générale
Crédit Agricole 
Credit Europe Bank 
Garanti BBVA (part of the BBVA Group)
First Bank
Intesa Sanpaolo 
Libra Internet Bank
Vista Bank
OTP Bank
Porsche Bank
ProCredit Bank 
Raiffeisen Bank
UniCredit Bank

Retail banks (domestically-owned banks)
Banca Romana de Credite si Investitii (formerly ATEbank Romania)
Banca Românească (part of the EximBank Group)
Banca Transilvania
Idea Bank (part of the Banca Transilvania Group)
CEC Bank
Patria Bank
TechVentures Bank

Corporate banks
EximBank

Romanian branches of international banks

Retail banks
ING
BNP Paribas Personal Finance
TBI Bank

Corporate banks
Blom Bank France
BNP Paribas Fortis
Citibank Europe

List of systemic banks
As of 2022, the National Committee of Macroprudential Oversight of Romania has identified 9 locally-incorporated banks as systematically important and thus have to meet more stringent requirements:

Banca Transilvania
Banca Comercială Română (Erste Group)
UniCredit Bank
BRD – Groupe Société Générale
Raiffeisen Bank
CEC Bank
Alpha Bank
OTP Bank
EximBank

Market share of banks
The market share of banks in terms of assets (above 1%):

Discontinued operations

References

 "British bank launches new branch"  The Diplomat Bucharest
"Bank makes first venture abroad - Portugal" The Diplomat Bucharest
"Doha Bank opens office in Bucharest" Gulf Times

 
Banks
Romania
Banks
Romania